Ibrahim Koné (born 5 December 1989) is a professional footballer who plays as a goalkeeper for Maltese Premier League club Hibernians. Born in the Ivory Coast, he represents Guinea at international level.

Career
Born in Abidjan, Koné began his career with CF Excellence and joined later AS Odienné in his native Ivory Coast. In January 2008, he was on trial for several weeks with Rosenborg BK in Trondheim and was with those in a trainings camp in Gran Canaria. On 19 July 2008, he left AS Odienné and joined on trial Paris Saint-Germain, but he later signed for US Boulogne. Koné made his debut on 23 September 2009 against Paris Saint-Germain in the Coupe de la Ligue. He played all the 90 minutes on the field.

International career
Koné represented Ivory Coast at the 2007 Toulon Tournament and was voted as the best goalkeeper. and was formerly the back-up keeper at 2005 FIFA U-17 World Championship in Peru.

Of Guinean descent, Koné accepted a callup to represent the Guinea national football team on 25 April 2018.

Career statistics

International

Honours
Individual
Toulon Tournament Best Goalkeeper: 2007

References

External links
 
 

Living people
1983 births
Footballers from Abidjan
Association football goalkeepers
Citizens of Guinea through descent
Guinean footballers
Guinea international footballers
Ivorian footballers
Ivory Coast under-20 international footballers
Ivorian people of Guinean descent
Sportspeople of Guinean descent
Ivorian expatriate footballers
AS Denguélé players
US Boulogne players
Tarbes Pyrénées Football players
Pau FC players
Stade Bordelais (football) players
Żejtun Corinthians F.C. players
Ligue 1 players
Ligue 2 players
Championnat National players
Championnat National 2 players
Championnat National 3 players
Maltese Premier League players
2011 CAF U-23 Championship players
2019 Africa Cup of Nations players
Expatriate footballers in France
Expatriate footballers in Malta
Ivorian expatriate sportspeople in France
Ivorian expatriate sportspeople in Malta
Guinean expatriate sportspeople in France
Guinean expatriate sportspeople in Malta
Ivory Coast youth international footballers
2021 Africa Cup of Nations players